Mukul Chandra Goswami is an Indian social worker and the founder of Ashadeep, a non governmental organization which runs homes for people with mentally illness and works for the rehabilitation of the elderly and mental patients. Goswami, quitting his job as a banker, founded the organization in 1996 with activities based at his home in a modest manner but, over the years, the initiative has grown to include Roshmi, a home for mentally ill people, Navchetna, a project for the rehabilitation of the mental patients, Prashantiloy, a daycare centre for the elderly and an outdoor clinic. He was honored by the Government of India, in 2014, with the fourth highest Indian civilian award of Padma Shri.

References

Living people
Recipients of the Padma Shri in social work
Social workers
Social workers from Assam
Year of birth missing (living people)